Sandile Mthethwa (born 14 April 1997) is a South African professional soccer player who plays as a centre-back for Orlando Pirates and formerly the South Africa national football team.

Club career
Mthethwa was born in Ngwelezane, on the outskirts of Empangeni in KwaZulu-Natal. Mthethwa started his youth career at Shooting Stars, before playing for Flamengo FC of the SAFA Regional League between 2011 and 2013. He signed for the KZN Academy in 2013, and played for partner club Durban FC.

In May 2015, it was announced that Mthethwa had joined CS Maritimo on a one-year deal, but instead signed for Orlando Pirates in early 2016. He joined Richards Bay on loan in summer 2017, where he made 17 league appearances during the 2017–18 season. He returned to Richards Bay for a further season in summer 2018, and scored 4 goals across 26 appearances over the course of the 2018–19 season.

In July 2019, he joined Chippa United on a season-long loan. He made 8 appearances for Chippa United across the 2019–20 season. He returned to the club on loan for the 2020–21 season.

International career
Mthethwa has represented South Africa at both under-20 and senior international levels.

Style of play
Mthethwa plays as a centre-back.

References

Living people
1997 births
People from Empangeni
Soccer players from KwaZulu-Natal
South African soccer players
Association football central defenders
Orlando Pirates F.C. players
Richards Bay F.C. players
Chippa United F.C. players
South African Premier Division players
National First Division players
South Africa international soccer players
South Africa under-20 international soccer players